Eugen Seiterle (December 7, 1913 – November 23, 1998) was a Swiss field handball player who competed in the 1936 Summer Olympics. He was part of the Swiss field handball team, which won the bronze medal. He played three matches.

External links
Eugen Seiterle's profile at databaseOlympics
Eugen Seiterle's profile at Geneanet

1913 births
1998 deaths
Field handball players at the 1936 Summer Olympics
Olympic bronze medalists for Switzerland
Olympic handball players of Switzerland
Swiss male handball players
Olympic medalists in handball
Medalists at the 1936 Summer Olympics